Magolnik is a small settlement in the hills northeast of Dole in the Municipality of Litija in central Slovenia. The area is part of the traditional region of Lower Carniola. It is now included with the rest of the municipality in the Central Sava Statistical Region.

History
Magolnik was a hamlet of Dobovica until 1995, when it became a separate settlement.

References

External links
Magolnik on Geopedia

Populated places in the Municipality of Litija